The 2020 Summer Olympics order of play for matches on the main courts, starting from 24 July until July 1 August.

All dates and times are JST (UTC+09:00).

Day 1 (24 July)

 Seeds out:
 Women's Singles:  [16]
 Men's Doubles:  /  [2],  /  [5],  /  [6]
 Women's Doubles:  /  [5],  /  [7]
 Order of play

Day 2 (25 July)

 Seeds out:
 Men's Singles:  [5],  [9],  [10]
 Women's Singles:  [1],  [10],  [12]
 Men's Doubles:  /  [4]
 Women's Doubles:  /  [2],  /  [8]
 Order of play

Day 3 (26 July)

 Seeds out:
 Men's Singles:  [13]
 Women's Singles:  [3],  [6],  [10]
 Men's Doubles:  /  [7],  /  [8]
 Women's Doubles:  /  [3]
 Order of play

Day 4 (27 July)

 Seeds out:
 Men's Singles:  [7],  [11]
 Women's Singles:  [2],  [5],  [8],  [14]
 Order of play

Day 5 (28 July)

 Seeds out:
 Men's Singles:  [3],  [8],  [15],  [16]
 Women's Singles:  [7],  [13]
 Men's Doubles:  /  [3]
 Women's Doubles:  /  [4],  /  [6]
 Mixed Doubles:  /  [1],  /  [3]
 Order of play

Day 6 (29 July)

 Seeds out:
 Men's Singles:  [2],  [14]
 Mixed Doubles:  /  [2]
 Order of play

Day 7 (30 July)

 Order of play

Day 8 (31 July)

 Seeds out:
 Men's Singles:  [1]
 Women's Singles:  [15]
 Order of play

Day 9 (1 August)

 Seeds out:
 Men's Singles:  [12]
 Order of play

References